The 1971–72 Divizia A was the fifty-fourth season of Divizia A, the top-level football league of Romania.

Teams

League table

Results

Top goalscorers

Champion squad

See also 

 1971–72 Divizia B
 1971–72 Divizia C
 1971–72 County Championship

References

Liga I seasons
Romania
1971–72 in Romanian football